Robert Carlton Wilson (April 5, 1916 – August 12, 1999) was an American politician, who served 14 terms as a member of the United States House of Representatives from California from 1953 to 1981. He was a member of the Republican Party.

Biography
Wilson was born on April 5, 1916, in Calexico, California. He attended San Diego State College (now San Diego State University) and Otis Art Institute (now Otis College of Art and Design). He served in World War II stateside in the Army commissary, 1940 – 1945. After the war, he was in the Marine Corps Reserve, rising to the rank of colonel, and was a partner in two advertising agencies.

Wilson first became involved in politics campaigning for Dwight D. Eisenhower in 1952.  He was recruited to run in the newly created 30th District, based in San Diego, California. When Wilson phoned his wife, Jean Bryant Wilson, with the news he was selected by the Republicans to run, she laughed saying "You a Congressman?" He was elected amid Eisenhower's gigantic landslide that year.

Wilson was reelected 13 times, rarely facing serious opposition as San Diego was a Republican stronghold.  His campaigns featured anti-communism themes, stressing the importance of a strong military. He also opposed high taxes, championing rugged individualism instead. While in Congress he became a major spokesman for the defense industry and played a large role in the development of a military presence in San Diego. From 1959 until his retirement he was a member of the House Armed Services Committee. From 1968 to his retirement he served as chair of the National Republican Congressional Committee.  He was well-known and popular in San Diego, and would blanket his district with pot holders and other gifts with his name on it during election time. Several households still have the 40-page Bob Wilson Barbecue Cook Book he sent out.  While in office, he patented a "Smack-Its", a table-top tetherball game. Wilson voted in favor of the Civil Rights Acts of 1957, 1960, 1964, and 1968, and the Voting Rights Act of 1965, while Wilson voted present on the 24th Amendment to the U.S. Constitution.

In 1980, Wilson decided not to run for a 15th term.  He served as co-chairman of American Freedom Coalition with Congressman Richard Ichord.  He was a member of the California Society of the Sons of the American Revolution.

Wilson died on August 12, 1999, in Chula Vista, California, at the age of 83. He is buried at Fort Rosecrans National Cemetery in San Diego.

See also
 Nugan Hand Bank

References

External links
 

1916 births
1999 deaths
Balboa Park (San Diego)
Burials at Fort Rosecrans National Cemetery
Politicians from San Diego
San Diego State University alumni
People from Chula Vista, California
Republican Party members of the United States House of Representatives from California
20th-century American politicians
People from Calexico, California
American anti-communists